St Paul's Church, Bordesley Green is a Grade A locally listed parish church in the Church of England in Birmingham.

History

The church was founded as a mission church from St Margaret's Church, Ward End in 1911 for the Ideal Village which was being constructed in Bordesley Green. A red brick building was constructed in 1913, and was consecrated in 1929.

In 1969, a long-awaited large church was built at the same site to the designs of the architect John P Osborne. In 1999, this was beautifully reordered to form a multi-purpose building which is used both for worship and as a Conference Centre with meeting rooms and offices. The present building offers a stimulating environment under a low pitch copper felt roof. The trapezoidal plan tapers symmetrically from West to East. Stained glass windows by Margaret Trehearne were installed. The chapel sheds beautiful light through the red and blue stained glass.

The mission church was reordered in 1993 and now houses a purpose designed and Ofsted Outstanding Day Nursery, serving the local community.
The associated Crossover Charity operating from 619 Bordesley Green provides a Resource Centre serving the community and contributing to well-being through support for unemployed people and many others projects.

Organ

The organ was removed prior to reorganisation in 1999. One of the musicians who played the organ in his youth is Roger Jones, leader of CMM - Christian Music Ministries.

External links
St Paul's Nursery School
St Paul's Centre Conference & Meeting Facilities
Crossover (charity's website)

References

Church of England church buildings in Birmingham, West Midlands
Churches completed in 1968
20th-century Church of England church buildings